Women in Azerbaijan nominally enjoy the same legal rights as men; however, societal discrimination remains a problem. Baku Research Institute reports that: "Violations of privacy in political and social relations, such as interfering in private life, the sharing of private information, and unauthorized access to private space, are widespread in Azerbaijan".

Voting rights 

Universal suffrage was introduced in Azerbaijan in 1919 by the Azerbaijan Democratic Republic, thus making Azerbaijan the first Muslim-majority country ever to enfranchise women.

Political representation 
The State Committee for Family, Women and Children Affairs of Azerbaijan Republic is the primary government agency overlooking the activities in protection of rights of women in the country. There are no legal restrictions on the participation of women in politics. As of 2020, there were 22 women in the 125-seat parliament, including the Speaker of the National Assembly. The percentage of female members of parliament increased from 11 to 17.6 percent between 2005 and 2020.

In 2017, Mehriban Aliyeva (the president's wife) was appointed Vice President of Azerbaijan, the highest position a woman has occupied in Azerbaijan since the abolition in 1994 of the office of Secretary of State most recently occupied by Lala Shovkat.

In 2020, Sahiba Gafarova was appointed the Speaker of the National Assembly of Azerbaijan. As of the same year, Azerbaijan had one female cabinet minister (Mahabbat Valiyeva, Minister of Education), one regional cabinet minister (Natavan Gadimova, Minister of Culture of the Nakhchivan AR), one state committee chair (Bahar Muradova, chair of the State Committee for Family, Women and Children Affairs), one head of a regional executive government (Irada Gulmammadova, head of the Absheron District), Commissioner for Human Rights (Sabina Aliyeva), three ambassadors and one head of a diplomatic office. Women constituted 3 of the 16 members of the Central Election Commission and chaired of 4 of the 125 district election commissions. Despite the fact that as of 2016, 11% of the country's professional judges were women (including Sona Salmanova, Deputy Chair of the Constitutional Court), this remains the lowest proportion in Europe.

In May 2021, Amnesty International published a briefing on gender-based reprisals against women in Azerbaijan, documenting systematic attempts to defame and silence women activists and their partners through smear campaigns, accusations, as well as blackmail by hacking to their social network accounts and publishing of private information, including material of sexual nature. Amnesty International’s Researcher on South Caucasus, Natalia Nozadze, stated that:  “The pattern and methods of these gendered reprisals and the fact that the targets are women who have exposed human rights violations or been critical of the authorities, strongly indicates that the Azerbaijani authorities are either directly responsible or complicit in these crimes. It is the repressive government of Azerbaijan that stands to benefit from these dirty methods”.

Participation in the job market 

Though the majority of Azerbaijani women have jobs outside the home, women are underrepresented in high-level jobs, including top business positions.

As of 2017, 78.1% of all teaching staff (including 51.9% of all university lecturers), 64.9% of all medical staff and 40.2% of athletes in Azerbaijan were women. However, for the same period, women accounted for just 28.7% of civil servants and 20.9% of registered business owners.

Military 
In 1931, Leyla Mammadbeyova, born in Baku, became one of the first Soviet female aviators and paratroopers, the first one in the Caucasus and the Middle East. Around 600,000 natives of Azerbaijan fought in World War II as part of the Red Army, with 10,000 of those being women who had voluntarily signed up and served both as military and medical personnel, the most prominent ones being sniper Ziba Ganiyeva and pilot Zuleykha Seyidmammadova. During the active phase of the first Nagorno-Karabakh War in the 1990s, 2,000 of Azerbaijan's 74,000 military personnel were women, and 600 of them directly took part in the military operations. Military service for women is voluntary; currently there are around 1,000 women serving in the Azerbaijani army.

Religion 
Though a secular country, Azerbaijan requires certification and registration for people performing religious rites. Muslim women in Azerbaijan can study to become certified mullahs and lead women-only gatherings, a unique local tradition that goes back centuries. As of 2016, there was one local female Lutheran pastor in Azerbaijan.

Domestic violence 

On 22 June 2010, the Azerbaijani Parliament adopted the Law on Prevention of Domestic Violence.

In 2000, Azerbaijan signed up to the Optional Protocol of CEDAW, recognizing the competence of the Committee on the Elimination of Discrimination against Women, after which it can receive and consider complaints from individuals or groups within its jurisdiction.

Rape is illegal in Azerbaijan and carries a maximum 15-year prison sentence. A new domestic violence law come into force in 2010, which criminalized spousal abuse, including marital rape.  Nevertheless, others highlight that in reality many in Azerbaijan do not consider this as a crime and the prevailing culture does not encourage complaints about marital rape.

During 2011 female members of parliament and the head of the State Committee on Women and Children increased their activities against domestic violence. Media coverage of domestic violence issues also began to raise awareness of the problem. A 2010 law establishes a framework for investigation of domestic violence complaints, defines a process to issue restraining orders, and calls for the establishment of a shelter and rehabilitation center for victims.

However societal attitudes lag behind: 40% of Azerbaijanis surveyed in 2012 still believed that agree that women should tolerate domestic violence in order to keep their family together, and 22% agreed that there are times when a woman deserves to be beaten. The 2006 renaming of the state Committee on Women's Issues as the State Committee on Family, Women and Children’s Affairs (SCFWCA) has also been interpreted by some as a protectionist approach that views women as vulnerable “reproductive units" rather than independent individuals.

In July 2021, women’s rights activists brought a coffin to the Interior Ministry to protest and raise awareness of the recent increase in domestic violence against women. Police detained three activists and removed the others from the area. The detainees were released soon after being detained.

According to Norwegian Helsinki Committee report in 2021 a growing number of domestic violence cases endangers women’s lives in Azerbaijan. The report namely "exposes serious gaps  in the authorities’ response to domestic violence, including inadequate enforcement of existing legislation, and a failure to hold abusers accountable and ensure access to justice for survivors", highlighting that abuse is still widely perceived as a “family matter” and is  underreported to police.

Prostitution 

Prostitution is an administrative offense rather than a crime and is punishable by a fine of up to $102 (88 AZN). Pimps and brothel owners may be sentenced to prison for up to six years.

Timeline of women's emancipation
Note that this includes the period of time when Azerbaijan was a part of the Soviet Union, i.e.Azerbaijan Soviet Socialist Republic

References

Further reading
 Heyat, Farideh. Azeri Women in Transition: Women in Soviet and Post-Soviet Azerbaijan. Routledge (2002). .
 Violence Against Women in Azerbaijan . World Organisation Against Torture (November 2004). This report also addresses the status of women generally.
 Yuliya Aliyeva Gureyeva: "Policy Attitudes towards Women in Azerbaijan: Is Equality Part of the Agenda?" in the Caucasus Analytical Digest No. 21

External links 

 
Azerbaijan